Grand Prix motorcycle racing is the premier championship of motorcycle road racing, which has been divided into four classes since 2019; MotoGP, Moto2, Moto3, and MotoE. Former classes that are now discontinued include 350cc, 80cc/50cc and sidecars. The premier class is MotoGP, which was formerly known as the 500cc class. The Grand Prix Road-Racing World Championship was established in 1949 by the sport's governing body the Fédération Internationale de Motocyclisme (FIM), and is the oldest motorsport World Championship in existence. The motorcycles used in MotoGP are purpose built for the sport, and are unavailable for purchase by the general public: they cannot be legally ridden on public roads.

Giacomo Agostini holds the record for the most Grand Prix victories, having won 122 times. Valentino Rossi is second with 115 wins, and Ángel Nieto is third with 90 wins. Rossi holds the distinction of having the longest time between his first win and his last. The youngest winner of a Grand Prix is Can Öncü, who was 15 years and 115 days old when he won – as a wildcard on his Grand Prix début – the 2018 Moto3 Valencian Grand Prix. Arthur Wheeler is the oldest winner of a Grand Prix; he was 46 years old when he won the 1962 250cc Argentine Grand Prix. Ralf Waldmann, with 20 wins, holds the record for most race wins without becoming a World Champion.

By rider

By nationality

References
General
 
 

Specific

Winners